Moustapha Al Akkad (July 1, 1930 – November 11, 2005) was a Syrian-American film producer and director, best known for producing the original series of Halloween films and directing The Message and Lion of the Desert. He was killed along with his daughter Rima Al Akkad Monla in the 2005 Amman bombings.

Early life
Al Akkad was born on July 1, 1930, in Aleppo in the French Mandate for Syria and the Lebanon. He received his high school degree from the Aleppo American College. His father, then a customs officer, gave him $200 and a copy of the Quran before he left for the United States to study film direction and production at the University of California, Los Angeles (UCLA).  Akkad spent a further three years studying for a Master's degree at the University of Southern California (USC), where he met the director Sam Peckinpah. Peckinpah became Akkad's mentor in Hollywood and hired him as a consultant for a film about the Algerian War that never made it to the big screen, but he continued to encourage him until he found a job as a producer at CBS.

Career
In 1976, he produced and directed Mohammad, Messenger of God (released as The Message in 1977 in the United States), starring Anthony Quinn and Irene Papas. Akkad faced resistance from Hollywood, which forced him to make the film in Morocco.

While creating Muhammad, Messenger of God, he consulted Islamic clerics, he wanted and tried to be respectful towards Islam and its views on portraying Muhammad. He got the Approval from Al-Azhar University in Egypt but was rejected by the Muslim World League in Mecca, Saudi Arabia. The Governments of Kuwait, Libya and Morocco promised to support the film financially, and when it was rejected by the Muslim World League, Kuwait kept its financial support but stopped other kinds of supports. King Hassan II of Morocco gave his full support for the production of the film. The production took one year, Akkad filmed for 6 months in Morocco, but had to stop when the Saudi Government exerted great pressure on the government of Morocco to stop the production. Akkad went to Muammar Gaddafi of Libya for support in order to complete the project, Gaddafi allowed him to move the filming to Libya for the remaining 6 months until the film was finalized.

Akkad saw the film as a way to bridge the gap between the Western and Muslim worlds, stating in a 1976 interview:

In 1978, he helped make low-budget film history when he produced Halloween. Akkad became best known for his key involvement in the first eight Halloween films, as an executive producer (the only producer to participate in all of these films). The series was highly profitable and hugely influential to subsequent horror films. 

In 1980 he directed Lion of the Desert, in which Quinn and Irene Papas were joined by Oliver Reed, Rod Steiger, and John Gielgud. It was about the real-life Bedouin leader Omar Mukhtar (Quinn), who fought Benito Mussolini's Italian troops in the deserts of Libya. The movie is now critically acclaimed, after initially receiving negative publicity in the West for being partially funded by Libya's Muammar Gaddafi, who invested $35 million in the movie. This negative publicity may have been the cause of its relatively poor performance at the box office. Clint Morris describes the movie as: "A grand epic adventure that'll stand as a highpoint in the producing career of Moustapha Akkad." In 1985, his production company Trancas International Films had inked an agreement with Galaxy International releasing in order to release films for a seven-picture agreement worldwide.

In the United Kingdom, Akkad once tried to buy Pinewood Studios from The Rank Organisation and also had a studio at Twickenham. At the time of his death, he was in the process of producing an $80 million movie featuring Sean Connery about Saladin and the Crusades, for which he already had the script, that would be filmed in Jordan. Speaking of the film, he said:

Death
Akkad and his 34-year-old daughter, Rima Akkad Monla, were killed in the 2005 Amman bombings.  They were both in the lobby at the Grand Hyatt Amman on November 9 when a bomb exploded; his daughter died instantly, and Akkad died of his injuries two days later in a hospital. He is buried in the Al-Jadidah Cemetery in Aleppo in Syria.

Akkad was survived by his former wife, Patricia Al Akkad and their sons, Taric and Malek, who helped produce most of the Halloween movies, as well as his widow, Suha Ascha Akkad, and their son Zade.

Legacy
He was honoured by his native city of Aleppo, and the Aleppo City Council has renamed a school and a street after Moustapha Akkad. In 2008, a street in downtown Beirut was renamed after Moustapha Akkad. The 2007 remake of Halloween was dedicated to Moustapha Akkad. The 2018 film Halloween, a direct sequel to the 1978 original film, also features a dedication to Akkad in the end credits.

Filmography

References

External links

 
 Aljazeera. Firas Al-Atraqchi. An Arab American director's legacy
 Juan Cole. The Strange Death of Moustapha Akkad
   The Telegraph. Moustapha Akkad

1930 births
2005 deaths
American film directors
Syrian film directors
American film producers
Syrian film producers
American Muslims
Syrian Muslims
American people murdered abroad
Syrian people murdered abroad
American terrorism victims
Syrian murder victims
Deaths by suicide bomber
Arabic-language film directors
People from Aleppo
Syrian emigrants to the United States
Terrorism deaths in Jordan
People murdered in Jordan
People killed by al-Qaeda in Iraq
Mass murder victims
2000s murders in Jordan
2005 crimes in Jordan
2005 murders in Asia